Fakin' da Funk is a 1997 comedy film written and directed by Tim Chey. It stars Pam Grier, Ernie Hudson, Dante Basco, Tone Loc, Margaret Cho, and Tatyana Ali. The film is about two Asian-American youths trying to adjust to a new environment in South Central Los Angeles, with one being a Chinese boy who was adopted and raised by Black parents, and the other a foreign-exchange student.

Plot 
Joe and Annabelle Lee, a Black couple living in Atlanta, are thrown for a surprise when they learn the baby that they adopted is Chinese and not black. Despite the mix-up, they decide to raise the baby, Julian, as their own. After Joe’s death a few years later, the family decides to uproot from Atlanta to Los Angeles. Once in LA, Julian tries to befriend his peers, but they are perplexed that he is Asian, yet talks and acts as if he is Black. Julian is also forced to intervene when his younger brother Perry falls in with a local gang. 

In a parallel plot, foreign-exchange student May-Lee similarly experiences confusion when she discovers that she is being housed with a black family in South Central.

Cast

Production 
The film was shot from July 9 to August 3, 1996 in South Central LA.

Release
The film had its world premiere in July 1997 at the Asian American International Film Festival. It went on to screen at the Hamptons International Film Festival that October. It also screened at the Urbanworld Film Festival, where it won the Audience Award, and the Los Angeles Asian Pacific Film Festival.

The film was aired on the USA Network, where it became one of the channel’s highest-rated films.

It was released on DVD on January 4, 2000, by Image Entertainment.

Reception
Brendan Kelly of Variety called the film "an energetic, highly likable comedy". He added, "Chey keeps it grooving along at a good pace with lots of laughs along the way, making for a fun, if fairly light, look at a complicated subject", and though "the storytelling is a tad predictable", "the abundance of comic moments helps keep [its] feel-good message about racial harmony from becoming too earnest." 

Nathan Rabin of The A.V. Club was more critical, writing "As in similar films—Woo, Sprung, I Got The Hook-Up, Booty Call—Fakin' Da Funk derives humor from exactly three sources: people insulting one another's parentage, random pop-culture references, and various misunderstandings concerning cultural differences."

References

External links
 
 
 

1997 films
1997 comedy films
1997 directorial debut films
1997 independent films
Comedy films about Asian Americans
Hood films
Hood comedy films
Films about adoption
Films about immigration to the United States
Films about race and ethnicity
African-American comedy films
Films about Chinese Americans
Films directed by Timothy A. Chey
Films set in Los Angeles
Films shot in Los Angeles
1990s English-language films
1990s American films